Carlos Muñoz Arosa (3 April 1919 - 15 April 2005) was a Spanish actor. He appeared in more than one hundred films from 1939 to 1991.

Selected filmography

References

External links 

1919 births
2005 deaths
Spanish male film actors